Ben Grabli (born 8 April 1994) is an Israeli footballer who currently plays at Maccabi Herzliya.

Notes

1994 births
Living people
Israeli footballers
Footballers from Beersheba
Hapoel Be'er Sheva F.C. players
Hapoel Nir Ramat HaSharon F.C. players
Hapoel Tel Aviv F.C. players
Bnei Yehuda Tel Aviv F.C. players
Hapoel Kfar Saba F.C. players
Hapoel Petah Tikva F.C. players
Hapoel Acre F.C. players
Hapoel Bnei Lod F.C. players
Hapoel Iksal F.C. players
Hapoel Ashkelon F.C. players
Hapoel Marmorek F.C. players
F.C. Dimona players
Bnei Eilat F.C. players
Maccabi Herzliya F.C. players
Israeli Premier League players
Liga Leumit players
Israel under-21 international footballers
Israeli people of Moroccan-Jewish descent
Association football central defenders